Vlada Stošić (born 31 January 1965) is a Serbian former professional footballer who played as a midfielder.

He is best known for his spell with Red Star Belgrade in the 1980s and 1990s, being part of the side's European Cup victory in 1991.

Club career
Stošić was born in Vranje, Socialist Federal Republic of Yugoslavia. During his early career he represented Red Star Belgrade, who also loaned him to FK Rad, FK Radnicki Nis and a club in Australia. In Red Star's 1990–91 victorious campaign in the European Cup, he played the last minutes of the final match, which went into extra time as the team emerged victorious over Olympique de Marseille after a penalty shootout.

Stošić played in the last edition of the Yugoslavian League before he left for Spain in January 1992, where he proceeded to be an undisputed starter for both RCD Mallorca and Real Betis, although he was relegated in his debut season with the former. After failing to feature in the first half of 1996–97 with the latter, he moved to Mexico with Atlante FC, where he teamed up with former Red Star teammate Miodrag Belodedici; he closed out his career the ensuing summer at the age of 33, with Portugal's Vitória de Setúbal.

Stošić returned to Betis in 2010, working with the Andalusians as director of football. He was relieved of his duties on 22 December 2013, shortly after manager Pepe Mel, due to poor results.

International career
On 12 September 1990, Stošić earned his sole cap for Yugoslavia, in Belfast against Northern Ireland: it consisted of one minute, as he came on as a substitute for Dragan Stojković in a 2–0 win for the UEFA Euro 1992 qualifiers, with the nation winning its group but not being allowed to participate.

References

External links

Betisweb stats and bio 

OzFootball profile

1965 births
Living people
People from Vranje
Yugoslav footballers
Serbian footballers
Association football midfielders
Yugoslav First League players
Red Star Belgrade footballers
FK Rad players
FK Radnički Niš players
A-League Men players
Footscray JUST players
La Liga players
Segunda División players
RCD Mallorca players
Real Betis players
Liga MX players
Atlante F.C. footballers
Primeira Liga players
Vitória F.C. players
Yugoslavia international footballers
Yugoslav expatriate footballers
Serbian expatriate footballers
Serbia and Montenegro expatriate footballers
Serbia and Montenegro footballers
Expatriate soccer players in Australia
Expatriate footballers in Spain
Expatriate footballers in Mexico
Expatriate footballers in Portugal
Yugoslav expatriate sportspeople in Australia
Serbia and Montenegro expatriate sportspeople in Spain
Serbia and Montenegro expatriate sportspeople in Mexico
Serbian expatriate sportspeople in Portugal